School Knott is a hill in the Lake District, England, to the east of Windermere town, Cumbria. It is the subject of a chapter of Wainwright's book The Outlying Fells of Lakeland. It has a rocky outcrop but no trig point and, as reported by Wainwright, no cairn. Schoolknott Tarn is to the south-east of the summit.

References

  

Fells of the Lake District